The TaxiBot is a semi-robotic towbarless aircraft tractor developed by the Lahav Division of Israel Aerospace Industries. The tractor can tow an aircraft from the terminal gate to the take-off point (taxi-out phase) and return it to the gate after landing (taxi-in phase). The TaxiBot eliminates the use of airplane engines during taxi-in and until immediately prior to take-off during taxi-out, significantly reducing aircraft fuel usage and the risk of foreign object damage. The TaxiBot is controlled by the pilot from the cockpit using the regular pilot controls and has an 800-hp hybrid-electric engine.

The TaxiBot has two models. The Narrow-Body (NB) TaxiBot will be used by existing and future single-aisle aircraft such as the Airbus A320 and Boeing 737 while the Wide-Body (WB) TaxiBot aim for all existing and future twin-aisle aircraft such as Airbus A380 and Boeing 747.

History
The TaxiBot completed certification tests in July 2014, was approved for airport towing in November 2014. and had the first commercial flight dispatch-towed, Lufthansa LH140 from Frankfurt to Nuremberg, on November 25, 2014. In February 2015, the TaxiBot entered regular flight operations by Lufthansa at Frankfurt Airport. Certification tests of the wide-body model are expected to start in autumn of 2015 with aim for certification in early 2016.

In October 2019, Air India became the first airline to "regularly" use the TaxiBot by deploying the unit to despatch a Delhi-Mumbai flight from Terminal 3 of Indira Gandhi International Airport in New Delhi, one of the Top 10 airports in the world by annual passenger traffic.

Marketplace
The TaxiBot is the only certified and operational alternative taxiing system currently in the market. Competing products in development by WheelTug and EGTS International are different as they are installed directly on the aircraft landing gear. This allows for shorter turnaround time but adds weight to the aircraft.  Though it was considered successful, the EGTS partnership was dissolved in July 2016 due to the new economics imposed by the sharp drop in the price of jet fuel, .

References

External links 
 

Vehicles of Israel
Aircraft ground handling
Tractors